Bucharest Non Stop is a 2015 Romanian comedy-drama film directed by the Romanian actor, director and film producer .

Cast 
  - Achim
 Ion Besoiu - Bătrânul (The Old Man)
  - Bătrâna (The Old Woman)
 Adrian Titieni - Giani
  - Jeny
 Alexandru Papadopol - Gelu
  - Dora
 Dorian Boguță - Bodo

References

External links 

2015 comedy films
Romanian comedy films